Dutch cargo airline Martinair serves the following 16 scheduled freight destinations as of April 2020.

List

See also
Martinair destinations for a list of now discontinued passenger services.

References

Lists of airline destinations